Choranthias tenuis, the threadnose bass, is a species of ray-finned fish within the family Serranidae. Its distribution covers the western Atlantic near areas such as Bermuda, North Carolina, Florida, Texas, Georgia, South Carolina, Mississippi, Venezuela, Guyana, southeastern Gulf of Mexico, Yucatan, Puerto Rico, and the southern Caribbean, where it lives in subtropical waters over hard bottoms with large rocks that allow for micro habitats. The depths the species occurs is 55 to 915 meters, however individuals are more commonly found at depths less than 150 meters. It is commonly found at 8 centimeters in length and a maximum of 9 centimeters. It feeds on plankton and swims in schools.

Choranthias tenuis has been assessed as a 'Least concern' species by the IUCN Red List as it has a large distribution with no known major threats. It does occasionally occur in the aquarium trade.

References 

Fish described in 1920
Serranidae
Fish of the Gulf of Mexico
Fish of the Caribbean
Fish of the Atlantic Ocean
IUCN Red List least concern species